Keith Trevis Thibodeaux (born May 16, 1974) is a former American football cornerback in the National Football League for four teams from 1997 to 2001. He played college football at Northwestern State University and was drafted in the fifth round of the 1997 NFL Draft.

1974 births
American football cornerbacks
Atlanta Falcons players
Green Bay Packers players
Living people
Minnesota Vikings players
Northwestern State Demons football players
People from Opelousas, Louisiana
Players of American football from Louisiana
Washington Redskins players